The men's coxless pair rowing event at the 2011 Pan American Games will be held from October 16–18 at the Rowing & Canoeing Course in Ciudad Guzman. The defending Pan American Games champion is Dan Casaca and Christopher Jarvis of Canada.

Schedule
All times are Central Standard Time (UTC-6).

Results

Heats

Heat 1

Heat 2

Repechage

Final B

Final A

References

Rowing at the 2011 Pan American Games